Big Medium was a browser-based web content management system (CMS) written in the Perl programming language and developed by Global Moxie, the Paris-based company of independent developer Josh Clark.

History
Big Medium 1.0 was announced on January 13, 2003. The last release of Big Medium was version 2.0, released on December 17, 2007 after more than a year of public beta-testing. It was paid software distributed under a proprietary license. On February 19, 2012 the developer announced that there would be no additional development and support of the product.

The name "Big Medium" is a double entendre, referring to both the Internet as a communication medium and to a medium as a psychic who helps ordinary people communicate with unseen worlds.

Audience
Big Medium is billed as a CMS "aimed at web designers and their clients," and unlike many general-purpose content management systems, it is intended to be easy to install and configure without the aid of a web developer. Big Medium's flexible design templates support a wide range of original designs and require no programming knowledge beyond HTML and CSS. Once these templates are configured, content editors can add and update pages with no specific technical knowledge. (Big Medium also comes with a modest library of design themes allowing non-designers to get started right away.)

Big Medium targets traditional content sites such as news, marketing and magazine sites. It is pre-configured to provide features and data fields common to this type of site. While this simplifies the process of setting up Big Medium for a broad category of websites, this targeted pre-configuration makes the software relatively inflexible for managing other site types, including commerce or community sites. However, additional fields and content types can be added via custom plugin modules.

Features
 Simple, flexible templating for complete control over the design
 Search engine-friendly URLs
 Static pages
 Rich-text editing with WYSIWYG editor or Markdown syntax
 WYSIWYG CSS style editor
 Version control for page edits
 Libraries for images, documents, media and authors promote easy reuse
 Auto-sizing of images and thumbnails
 Image galleries and slideshows
 Pullquotes
 Visitor comments, with anti-spam features including built-in Akismet support
 Tags and tag clouds
 Site search
 Extensible plugin support
 Integrated link management
 Manage multiple websites
 Multiple editor accounts with category-specific editing privileges
 Unlimited levels of nested sub-categories for pages
 Syndication via RSS news feeds and JavaScript widgets
 Lightweight publishing workflow
 Scheduled publication of pages

Technical details
Big Medium installs on web servers running Windows NT, Windows 2003 or a Unix-like operating system.

Big Medium stores its data in flat files and folders, rather than a database. This has advantages (e.g., simplified installation and backups) but also means that it is best suited for small- and medium-sized sites with fewer than several thousand pages. Clark has suggested that future versions may offer the choice between flat-file storage and a relational database to better support very large sites. Additional fields and content types can be added via custom plugin modules.

Big Medium generates public web pages as static pages, meaning that they are not built on the fly with every page request but just once when the page is edited. This approach scales well under very high traffic conditions but means that there are limited opportunities to personalize pages for individual users.

Big Medium supports plugins and can be extended via custom Perl code to add additional content types, data fields, content filters, display widgets, etc. This developer API was added in version 2.0, but the documentation for plugins is incomplete.

See also
 Web content management system
 List of content management systems
 Comparison of content management systems

References

External links
Big Medium at Globalmoxie
Website Designing & Development
Eshop Development & Maintenance

Content management systems
Website management
Perl software